Isabella Kai Rice (born September 13, 2006) is an American child actress, best known for her role of young Alison DiLaurentis in the series Pretty Little Liars and Sarah Compton in True Blood.

Career 
In 2014, Rice played the role of Sarah Compton, Bill Compton's daughter in the season 7 of the HBO's fantasy horror series True Blood. Later, she appeared in the season 5 and 6 of the ABC Family's teen drama series Pretty Little Liars. She played the role of young Alison DiLaurentis, originally played by Sasha Pieterse.

Rice has played the role of young Jerrica Benton in the 2015 musical fantasy film Jem and the Holograms, which was directed by Jon M. Chu.

Rice portrayed Lily in the female-centric thriller film Unforgettable (2017), along with Katherine Heigl, Rosario Dawson, and Geoff Stults for Warner Bros.

Filmography

Film

Television

References

External links 
 

Living people
American child actresses
American film actresses
American television actresses
21st-century American actresses
2006 births
Actresses from Los Angeles